Uzbekistan is competing at the 2013 World Aquatics Championships in Barcelona, Spain between 19 July and 4 August 2013.

Swimming

Uzbekistani swimmers achieved qualifying standards in the following events (up to a maximum of 2 swimmers in each event at the A-standard entry time, and 1 at the B-standard):

Men

Women

Synchronized swimming

Uzbekistan has qualified the following synchronized swimmers.

Water polo

Women's tournament

Team roster

Elena Dukhanova
Diana Dadabaeva
Aleksandra Sarancha
Angelina Djumalieva
Evgeniya Ivanova
Ekaterina Morozova
Natalya Plyusova
Anna Shcheglova
Ramilya Halikova
Adelina Zinurova
Guzelya Hamitova
Anna Plyusova
Natalya Shlyonskaya

Group play

Round of 16

References

External links
Barcelona 2013 Official Site

Nations at the 2013 World Aquatics Championships
2013 in Uzbekistani sport
Uzbekistan at the World Aquatics Championships